Bill Jackson or Billy Jackson may refer to:

Sports
 Bill Jackson (first baseman) (1881–1958), professional baseball player, 1914–1915
 Bill Jackson (pitcher) (fl. 1890–1906), pitcher and outfielder for early minor leagues and Negro leagues
 Billy Jackson (boxer), British boxer
 Bill Jackson (Australian footballer) (1874–1921), Australian rules footballer
 Bill Jackson (footballer, born 1894) (1894–1917), English footballer
 Bill Jackson (American football) (born 1960), former professional American football defensive back
 Billy Jackson (American football) (born 1959), former professional American football running back
 Bill Jackson (bowls) (born 1915), Rhodesian lawn bowler
 Billy Jackson (bowls) (born 1970), English bowls player
 Billy Jackson (footballer) (1902–1974), English footballer

Other
 Billy Morrow Jackson (1926–2006), American painter
 Bill Jackson (photographer) (born 1953), English photographer
 Bill Jackson (politician) (born 1932), U.S. state senator from Georgia 
 Bill Jackson (television personality) (1935–2022), American television personality, cartoonist, and educator
 Billie Jackson, EastEnders character, also called Billy Jackson

See also
 William Jackson (disambiguation)
 Will Jackson (disambiguation)